Alexander Maier (born 16 July 1974) is an Austrian snowboarder. He competed at the 2002 Winter Olympics and the 2006 Winter Olympics. He is the brother of former skier Hermann Maier.

References

1974 births
Living people
Austrian male snowboarders
Olympic snowboarders of Austria
Snowboarders at the 2002 Winter Olympics
Snowboarders at the 2006 Winter Olympics
People from St. Johann im Pongau District
Sportspeople from Salzburg (state)